Alan Hardman (19 May 1937 – 10 May 2021) was an English former professional rugby league footballer who played in the 1950s, 1960s and early 1970s.  An England international representative , he played at club level in England for St Helens prior to carrying out his National Service in the British Army.

Early life and background
Hardman was born in St Helens, Lancashire, England. 

His younger brother was Colin Hardman, a motorcycle sidecar racer who won an Isle of Man TT race as passenger to Dave Molyneux in 1989.

Playing career
After playing amateur rugby he turned professional, signing in 1952 with his home-town club, St. Helens. Hardman made his solitary appearance for England in 1956 against Australia, with his professional rugby career put on hold due to his national service requirement; his final appearance for St. Helens was against Wigan. The St Helens R.F.C.–Wigan Warriors rivalry left Hardman with two broken ribs and a broken nose.

Army Service
Hardman commenced his National Service in 1956. He joined the 7th Queen's Own Hussars, being part of the force tasked with containing the 1956 Hong Kong Riots. During this time he also represented his regiment on the rugby field.

Subsequent career
Returning to St. Helens following his stint in the army, he re-joined the club, subsequently being loaned out to Liverpool Stanley. Hardman retired from rugby in 1971 prior to emigrating to Australia.

Australia
Together with his wife and three children, Hardman moved to Australia in 1971, settling in Adelaide and taking a job with the Public Building Department of the Government of South Australia. Following his retirement, he and his wife continued to live in Adelaide.

Death
Hardman died on 10 May, 2021. He was survived by his wife and children.

References

External links
Saints Heritage Society profile

rl1908.com 1956 Kangaroo tour 
(archived by web.archive.org) Rugby League Records 
(archived by web.archive.org) All the rugby league tables since 1895
Runcorn Highfield RLFC
 Remember Runcorn Highfield on Facebook

Sources

1937 births
2021 deaths
7th Queen's Own Hussars soldiers
England national rugby league team players
English rugby league players
Liverpool City (rugby league) players
Rugby league players from St Helens, Merseyside
St Helens R.F.C. players
Rugby league fullbacks